Mount Nebo, West Virginia may refer to:
Mount Nebo, Nicholas County, West Virginia, an unincorporated community in Nicholas County
Mount Nebo, Preston County, West Virginia, an unincorporated community in Preston County